Rievaulx is a small village and civil parish in Rye Dale within the North York Moors National Park near Helmsley in North Yorkshire, England and is located in what was the inner court of Rievaulx Abbey, close to the River Rye. The population of the civil parish as taken at the 2011 Census was less than 100. Details are included in the civil parish of Sproxton, North Yorkshire.  The inner court of the monastery contained buildings such as the brewhouse, bakehouse and guesthouse. Its name originated as Rye (the river) + Norman-French val or valle = "valley". Its old local pronunciation was as "Rivers", and changed to "Reevo" when education brought a general familiarity with the French language.

Aelred of Rievaulx, the English Cistercian monk, was abbot of Rievaulx from 1147 until his death in 1167. He is regarded by Anglicans and Roman Catholics as a saint, and is buried in the Abbey.

The abbey was closed as part of the Dissolution of the Monasteries by Henry VIII in 1538 and the grounds were bought by the Earl of Rutland. He was keen to continue the iron-smelting industry which had been conducted by the monks. He therefore established a charcoal-fired blast furnace and the associated structures and workings in what became Rievaulx village. This continued until its disruption during the Civil War, with production ceasing in 1647.

The village then became agricultural in nature and remains as a small settlement, situated below the Abbey and the Rievaulx Terrace & Temples.  The old watermill has been converted into a house around the workings, many of which are still extant, including the mill wheel, though the mill has been out of operation for a long time.  The miller's cottage also still stands and is a separate abode. Almost all of the other buildings in the village are built with stones from the ruins of the Abbey. The only buildings built with materials from other sources are the buildings constructed after 1917, following the conservation of the Abbey.

When he was raised to the House of Lords in 1983, former prime minister Harold Wilson took the title Baron Wilson of Rievaulx, but chose to pronounce it Rivers (see above).

See also
Swiss Cottage, Rievaulx

References

External links
Information on the origin of the village

Villages in North Yorkshire
Civil parishes in North Yorkshire